The National Orchestra Service, Inc. (NOS), was the most important booking and management agency for territory bands across the Great Plains and other regions from the early 1930s through 1960.  NOS managed black, white and integrated orchestras and was headquartered in Omaha.

About 
National Orchestra Service specialized in booking ballroom dance orchestras known as territory bands. The company's reputation as the premier booking agent in that genre helped them dominate their industry for almost 20 years. Bands that NOS represented were typically smaller than the Glenn Miller-type orchestras, usually featuring about 12 pieces, sometimes 15; though ensemble sizes tended to wax and wane with the economy.

Territory 

NOS handled bookings in:

 Wisconsin
 Minnesota
 North Dakota
 South Dakota
 Montana
 Wyoming
 Nebraska
 Missouri
 Kansas
 Oklahoma
 Military bases

Origins 
February 1930 — National Orchestra Service was founded in Omaha. Serl Frank Hutton was its founder and sole proprietor until 1952, when Lee Williams joined as a partner.

By way of merger with Music Management Service in January 1954, Royce Stoenner and David Wenrich, who formed Music Management Service, joined NOS as salaried employees.  In September 1959, Royce Stoenner left the NOS agency to join as a 50% partner with the Dave Brumitt Agency, a territory band booking agency in Atlanta.

In 1939, the NOS headquarters at located at 709 World-Herald Building, Omaha, NE.  Later, NOS moved to the eleventh floor — the top floor — of the Omaha National Bank Building in Downtown Omaha. The top floor was actually the sixteenth and the address was 1611 City National Bank Bldg.

In February 1960, National Orchestra Service, Inc., folded.

World War II 
In August 1943, Lee Williams was the only band working for National Orchestra Service due to war rationing (gasoline, tires, and the like) and shortage of musicians (the draft).

Business model 
A booking contract consisted of an agency fee, typically 10% for "on location" dates (a week or greater) and 20% for one nighters.  One nighters paid more than "on location" dates.  In the 1950s, a one nighter could range from $750 to $1,000 for a Monday or Tuesday and $15,000 to $20,000 for a Friday or Saturday for some of the top bands.  "On location" bookings could range from $15,000 to $20,000 a week.  NOS required the hiring party to make a 50% deposit to solidify the contract.  The musicians, in theory, belonged to the Musicians Union through their local.  A component of a union contract required a rate to be paid to each musician based on traveling distance to the engagement.  The union also collected a fee from the ballroom operator (or employer), typically $10 per musician for an engagement.

Sleeper buses & trailers 
Many territory bands from NOS traveled in sleeper trailers connected to tractor-trailer trucks.  The most popular sleeper was manufactured by Wilson Trailer Company in Sioux City, IA.  They were purchased, owned, and maintained by the orchestras.  Lawrence Welk is thought to have been the first to design and use a sleeper.

Bands under management

Principals, employees

See also
 Music of Omaha
 Culture of North Omaha, Nebraska
 National Ballroom Operators Association

References
Notes

Inline citations

External links
 Territory Bands Data Base

Defunct companies based in Omaha, Nebraska
1944 establishments in Nebraska
1960 disestablishments in the United States
Music of Omaha, Nebraska
Jazz organizations